Morris Hill is a mountain located in the Catskill Mountains of New York northeast of Arkville. Fleischmann Mountain is located southeast and Hog Mountain is located northeast of Morris Hill.

References

Mountains of Delaware County, New York
Mountains of New York (state)